Hesperus Press is an independent publishing house based in London, United Kingdom. It was founded in 2001. The publisher's motto, "Et Remotissima Prope," is a Latin phrase which means "Bringing near what is far". Hesperus Press has published some 300 works by both classic and contemporary authors, including: Dante, Percy Bysshe Shelley, Dickens, Dostoyevsky, Flaubert, Kafka, Tolstoy, Woolf, Annie Dillard, and Aldous Huxley. Their series include: Hesperus Classics, Brief Lives, Poetic Lives, ON, Modern Voices, and Hesperus Worldwide. Hesperus is also responsible for the best-seller The Hundred-Year-Old Man Who Climbed Out the Window and Disappeared by Swedish author Jonas Jonasson, released in July 2012.

References

External links

Mentioned in The New York Times
Mentioned in The Guardian (Book Blog)
Mentioned in London Evening Standard
The Hundred-Year-Old Man mentioned in The Guardian
The Hundred-Year-Old Man mentioned in the Jordan Times
Dickens' Women mentioned in The Telegraph

Book publishing companies of the United Kingdom